So Hee-jung ( born on 28 May 1973) is a South Korean actress. She made her acting debut in 1994 in theater, since then, she has appeared in number of plays, films and television series. She got recognition for her supporting roles in The K2 (2016), Bossam: Steal the Fate (2021), Twenty-Five Twenty-One and Sh**ting Stars (2022). She has acted in films such as: Sunny (2011) and Intruder (2020) among others.

Education
So Hee-jung completed the Department of Theater at Dongguk University Graduate School and Graduated from University of Suwon, Department of Theater and Film.

Career
So Hee-jung started her career in theatres and made her debut in television in 2006 and in films in 2011. She appeared in film Sunny (2011), and TV series Angry Mom (2015), My Father Is Strange (2017), Psychopath Diary (2019), No Matter What, and Kairos (2020).

In 2022, she was cast in romantic TV series Twenty-Five Twenty-One as mother of lead character. The series was one of the highest-rated Korean dramas in cable television history. In the same year, she is appearing in tvN's romantic comedy Sh**ting Stars as housekeeper, and cast in tvN's drama Eve, which will begin airing from 1st June.

Filmography

Films

Television series

Web series

Theater

References

External links
 
 
 So Hee-jung on Daum 
 So Hee-jung on Play DB
 So Hee-jung on KMDb 

21st-century South Korean actresses
South Korean film actresses
South Korean television actresses
South Korean stage actresses
Living people
1973 births
University of Suwon alumni